Safehaven is an upcoming American supernatural thriller drama television series created by James Seale, based on his graphic novel of the same name. It stars Georgie Murphy, Bob Frazer, and Melissa Marie Elias.

Premise

Cast
 Georgie Murphy as Jenna Frost, a fierce, complicated high school comic book artist
 Bob Frazer as John Rayburn, the mysterious new school counselor
 Gino Anania as Will, a student seemingly obsessed with Jenna.
 Melissa Marie Elias as Ellen Harwick, a high school principal.
 Sophia Carriere as Holly, Jenna's best friend.
 Alec Carlos as Ethan, Jenna's best friend.
 Danika Frederick as Nikki Reeves, a back alley bounty hunter who Jenna suspects of harbouring an insidious secret.

Production

Development and pre-production
The comic book and graphic novel Safehaven was revealed by Michael Bay's 451 Media Group at the L.A. Comic Con on October 28, 2017. On July 1, 2020, it was announced that 451 Media Group would adapt the novel into a ten-episode series, working alongside Landmark Studio Group and Screen Media.

Filming and design

Initial production and filming for Safehaven began in June 2022, having been delayed due to the COVID-19 pandemic. To respect COVID-19 protocols and safety measures, the series was filmed using virtual sets including temperature checks and full-body scans along with weekly COVID-19 testing. Additionally, the cast and crew was given on-site campus-style accommodations, along with a "pod system with departments operating autonomous[ly]." On the subject of filming techniques, executive producers stated that "this production is going to embrace the best of old-world production techniques, including analog film stocks [...] and also cutting edge Virtual Set technologies to create the exciting parallel world in the Safehaven story. We also intend to utilize holograms from Groove Media And Entertainment in both the production and the promotion of Safehaven."

References

External links
 

American supernatural television series
2020s American drama television series
American thriller television series